The Treaty of Madrid, also known as the Treaty of Aquisgran, was a commercial treaty between Britain and Spain, formally signed on 5 October 1750 in Madrid.

Commercial tensions over the Asiento, a monopoly contract allowing foreign merchants to supply slaves to Spanish America (which was granted by the Spanish Crown to Britain via the 1713 Treaty of Utrecht), and alleged smuggling of British goods into Spain's American colonies led to the War of Jenkins Ear in 1739. This was followed by the War of the Austrian Succession, ended by the 1748 Treaty of Aix-la-Chapelle.

In addition to the Asiento, there was also a substantial import and export trade between Spain and Britain, carried out by British merchants based in Cádiz. Due to an error by negotiators at Aix-la-Chapelle, the treaty failed to renew their trading privileges, which were treated as cancelled by the Spanish. Both sides also claimed they were owed large sums of money in regards to the Asiento.

However, the trade through Cadiz was equally important to Spain, while Ferdinand VI, who succeeded as king in 1746, was more pro-British than his predecessor. This allowed the two sides to reach agreement on a new treaty, which restored trading privileges, while the Asiento was cancelled in return for a one time payment of £100,000 to the British.

Background
The 1713 Treaty of Utrecht awarded Britain merchants limited access to the closed markets of Spanish America; these included the Asiento de Negros to supply 5,000 slaves a year and a Navio de Permiso, permitting limited direct sales in Porto Bello and Veracruz. The South Sea Company established to hold these rights went bankrupt in the 1720 'South Sea Bubble', and became a state enterprise, owned by the British government.

The heavy taxes imposed on all goods officially imported into Spanish America created a large and profitable black market for smugglers, many of whom were British. The Asiento itself was marginally profitable and has been described as a 'commercial illusion'; between 1717 and 1733, only eight ships were sent from Britain to the Americas. The real benefit was that its ships were allowed to import goods customs-free.

However, the Spanish tended to arrest any vessels caught with illegal goods, regardless of whether they were technically chartered by the South Sea Company, while other traders smuggled slaves, undermining the monopoly granted by the Asiento. The result was a series of claims and counter-claims; by 1748, the British argued they were owed nearly £2 million by the Spanish Crown, which claimed equally large amounts the other way.

These commercial issues led to the outbreak of the War of Jenkins Ear in 1739, which became part of the wider War of the Austrian Succession in 1740, and the 1748 Treaty of Aix-la-Chapelle largely failed to remedy them. Although the Asiento was renewed for four years, the South Sea Company had neither the desire or capacity to continue; of far greater importance was the import and export trade carried out by British merchants based in Cádiz. British goods were imported for re-sale locally or re-exported to the colonies, Spanish dye and wool going the other way; one City of London merchant called the trade 'the best flower in our garden.'

Lord Sandwich, lead British negotiator at Aix-la-Chapelle, failed to include the Utrecht terms in the list of Anglo-Spanish agreements renewed in the Preliminaries to the treaty. When he tried to amend the final version, the Spanish refused to approve it, threatening the lucrative import and export trade between the two countries. However, both sides wanted to resolve the problem, since the trade was equally valuable to Spain, while Ferdinand VI was more pro-British than his French-born predecessor Philip V.

José de Carvajal y Lancáster, the Foreign Minister negotiated directly with Sir Benjamin Keene, the experienced British Ambassador to Spain; draft terms were agreed on 5 October 1749, it was not formally ratified until a year later. The asiento was cancelled and all claims settled in exchange for a payment of £100,000 to the South Sea Company, the Cadiz merchants were allowed to resume operations, and Britain received favourable terms for trading with Spanish America.

Provisions
The Treaty contained ten separate articles:

Article 1: Britain renounced its claim to the asiento and the Navio de Permiso;

Article 2: Spain paid compensation of £100,000, and in return, Britain cancelled any claim to further payments;

Article 3: Spain also cancelled claims relating to the asiento and the Navio de Permiso;

Article 4: British subjects would not pay higher (or other) duties in Spanish ports than those prevailing during the reign of Charles II of England;

Article 5: British subjects would be permitted to gather salt at Tortudos, as they had in the time of Charles II, allowing them to resume fishing operations by using it to preserve fish exported to Britain;

Article 6: British subjects would not pay higher duties than Spanish subjects;

Article 7: Subjects of both nations would pay the same duties, when bringing merchandise into each other's country by land, as they would by sea;

Article 8: Both countries would abolish all "innovations" that had been introduced into commerce;

Article 9: Arrangements were made to integrate the Treaty into the existing treaty system;

Article 10: An undertaking was made to execute the provisions of the Treaty promptly.

Aftermath
Settlement of these issues helped the Duke of Newcastle pursue his policy of improving relations between the two countries, while Keene helped ensure the appointment of a succession of Anglophile ministers, including José de Carvajal and Ricardo Wall. Although Keene died in 1757, while Charles III of Spain succeeded Ferdinand in 1759, as a result Spain remained neutral in the Seven Years' War between Britain and France until 1762.

References

Sources
 
 
 
 
 
 
 
 
 

War of the Austrian Succession
1750 in Great Britain
1750 in Spain
1750 treaties
War of Jenkins' Ear
Spanish Empire
Madrid (5 October 1750)
Madrid (5 October 1750)
Madrid (5 October 1750)